Catch Me... I'm in Love is a 2011 Filipino romantic film starring Sarah Geronimo and Gerald Anderson. It was released on March 23, 2011. This was the first team-up of Anderson and Geronimo on the silver screen; both of them already worked in a commercial advertisement.

They made their second movie of the tandem entitled Won't Last a Day Without You which premiered nationwide last November 30 at the same year.

Plot
Roanne Sanchez, a young girl with high ideals about romance is assigned to accompany the spoiled son of the president, Eric Rodriguez (Gerald Anderson) as he goes on an immersion trip. Coming from different worlds, the two find much to fight about, but sudden attraction between then soon gets the better of them.

Cast

Main Cast
Sarah Geronimo as Roan Sanchez
Gerald Anderson as Enrique "Eric" Rodriguez III

Supporting Cast
Sam Pinto as Nicole Morales
Matteo Guidicelli as Vitto
Julia Montes as Nikka
Joey Marquez as Mr. Sanchez
Arlene Muhlach as Mrs. Sanchez
Fred Payawan as PSG Head
Charee Pineda as Charms
Dino Imperial as Rojie
Janus Del Prado as Dan
Ketchup Eusebio as Jojo
Ian Galliguez as Girlie
Lito Legaspi as Mr. Morales
Alchris Galura as Paolo
Roden Araneta as NGO Supervisor
Princess Manzon as Cara
Josef Elizalde as Erick's Friend

Very Special Participation
Dawn Zulueta as First Lady Elena Rodriguez
Christopher De Leon as President Enrique Rodriguez Jr.

Cameo Roles
Erik Santos as himself
Gretchen Fullido as herself

Reception

Critical response
Critical reception of the film has been mostly positive from PEP.ph stating that "Catch Me...I'm In Love is a simple love story with a lot of heart". Mario Bautista of People's Journal praised Sarah's acting abilities quoting "She's a natural comedian who's very charming in her hilarious scenes but she also handles her dramatic scenes well", remarked about Gerald Anderson saying "He certainly proves he can be on his own and not just identified with his love team with Kim Chiu" and lastly praised Director Mae Cruz for the movie by quoting "No doubt, this movie's intention is to just make kilig the viewers and Director Mae Cruz definitely succeeds in her intentions".

Box office
According to Philippine Box Office Index and Weekend Box Office of Box Office Mojo the film debuted at 15.95 million placing at number 1 over Sucker Punch which debuted at 14.14 million. As of May 11, 2011 after 31 days of screenings, the film has had a total gross of P 120.88 million.Philippine Box Office Weekends For 2021

Awards

References

2011 films
Filipino-language films
Star Cinema films
Viva Films films
Philippine romance films
Films directed by Mae Cruz-Alviar